Jesús Alexander Piero Reyes Espinoza (born 11 January 2002) is a Peruvian footballer who plays as a right-back for Santos de Nasca, on loan from Sporting Cristal.

Career statistics

Club

Notes

References

2002 births
Living people
Peruvian footballers
Peru youth international footballers
Association football defenders
Peruvian Segunda División players
Sporting Cristal footballers
Santos de Nasca players